Edvard Fedorovych Kobak (born 22 April 2002) is a Ukrainian professional footballer who plays as a right winger for  Ukrainian side Shakhtar Donetsk.

References

External links
 
 

2002 births
Living people
People from Mukachevo
Ukrainian footballers
Ukrainian expatriate footballers
Association football forwards
Ukraine youth international footballers
FC Dnipro players
FC Shakhtar Donetsk players
FC Mynai players
NK Dubrava players
Ukrainian Premier League players
Ukrainian Second League players
First Football League (Croatia) players
Expatriate footballers in Croatia
Ukrainian expatriate sportspeople in Croatia
Sportspeople from Zakarpattia Oblast